2-Bromomescaline (2-Br-M) is a derivative of the phenethylamine hallucinogen mescaline which has an unusual 2-bromo substitution. It is an agonist for serotonin receptors, with a binding affinity of 215 nM at 5-HT1A, 513 nM at 5-HT2A and 379 nM at 5-HT2C, so while it is around ten times more tightly binding than mescaline at 5-HT1A and 5-HT2A receptors, it is over twenty times more potent at 5-HT2C.

See also
 6-Bromo-MDA
 6-Chloro-MDMA

References

Bromoarenes
Psychedelic phenethylamines
Serotonin receptor agonists